Busco novio para mi mujer is a 2016 Mexican romantic comedy film directed by Enrique Begne and co-written by Begne, Leticia López Margalli, and Gabriel Ripstein based on Pablo Solarz's 2008 Argentine film Un novio para mi mujer.

Plot
Fed up with his nagging and nitpicking wife Dana, Paco devises a plan to end his marriage: he hires professional womanizer/seducer "El Taiger" to whisk his wife off her feet.

Cast
 Arath de la Torre as Paco
 Sandra Echeverría as Dana
 Jesús Ochoa as El Taiger
 Alejandro Cuétara as Gabriel

Release
Busco novio para mi mujer opened theatrically in Mexico on 12 February 2016, and in the United States on 19 February 2016.

Box office
The film earned $1,133,078 in its opening weekend, ranking second behind Deadpool ($7,141,097).

Critical reception
The film received positive reviews from critics. On Rotten Tomatoes, the film has an 78% score based on 9 reviews, with an average rating of 4.75/10.

References

External links
 
 
 
 

2016 films
2010s Spanish-language films
2016 romantic comedy films
Mexican romantic comedy films
Remakes of Argentine films
2010s Mexican films